Juan Manén (or , 14 March 188326 June 1971) was a Spanish violinist and composer, born in Barcelona.

As a child, his progress in music was so rapid that his father exhibited him as a piano prodigy. Then, having studied the violin under Clemente Ibarguren, he debuted as a violinist, and met with such success that in Germany he was compared to his famous countryman Sarasate.  Likewise he attracted much attention as a composer, not only in Spain, but perhaps to even a greater degree in Germany, where he resided at different times for protracted periods.  His works comprise:  the operas Giovanni di Napoli (1903), Der Fackeltanz (1909) and Neró i Acté (1928) with  his own libretto;  the symphonic poem Nova Catalonia;  at least three violin concertos;  "Fantasia - Sonata" for guitar;  a suite for violin and piano; a piano quartet, a string quartet, and a number of exquisite miniatures for violin and orchestra.  He also made a completion-cum-arrangement of  Beethoven's Violin Concerto in C, which otherwise only survives in its first 259 measures.

Life 
Joan Manén was born in Barcelona, Catalonia. Precociously gifted, he learnt solfège and piano with his father from the age of three, and at seven played Chopin concertos in public. Meanwhile, at five, he had begun to study the violin with Vicente Negrevernis. The study of the piano and the violin is kept alike and with little time he develops an unusual facility for sight-reading all kinds of scores. In 1890 his father succeeded in convincing Clemente Ibarguren -formed in Paris- to give violin lessons to his son. They set two classes per week, and he rapidly attained astonishing technical mastery and at the age of nine made his début in Latin America. In the summer of 1892 Juanito's first public presentation takes place at the Nuevo Casino in Castellón, where he is a pianist and violinist in five successful concerts. The programs appear in the pieces "Adiós a la Alhambra" de Jesus de Monasterio, "Air varié" by Charles de Beriot, and "Balade et Polonaise" by Henry Vieuxtemps among others.

A press excerpt shows his success: "Indeed, it does not cease to be surprising in its own years, to see the ease and the ingenuity with which he manages the bow, the tuning and clarity of the sound and the perfection of his articulation, conditions are well directed, over time they will make the artist-child, what the French call a virtuoso " (Mercantil 7-VII-1892, Teatro Pizarro). He made his European début as a violinist in 1898, when he was hailed as a virtuoso of the first rank; he later made five world tours.

Almost entirely self-taught as a composer, Manén had begun to write at 13, and in 1900 he conducted a concert of his own works in Barcelona. It was in 1894 when his father, Joan Manén Abellan, believed that it was not enough that his son triumphed as a virtuoso of the violin and decided to start it in composition. As Joan Manén himself explains in the first volume of "My experiences", his father gave him a blank paper, hoping that he, without knowledge of harmony, would begin to compose some work. The first intents were an absolute failure, but after a while and in an intuitive way, he began to be aware of his talent as a composer. Manén was an involuntary self-taught person because throughout his childhood and adolescence his father, an entertainer, did not allow him to study composition at any conservatory. Looking at the history of music, it is difficult to find in the world of composition such an extraordinary case of self-learning. It must be remembered that his father, the only teacher of his son, was an amateur musician with few musical studies that only played the piano very discreetly. Several teachers offered to give classes of harmony and composition but the father used to say: "He will only learn it from the much music he reads. The instinct when possessed is the best teacher. " The ability to read in sight of the little Joan was extraordinary. He himself tells us that his father gave him many symphonic works and operas so he read them in the piano. In spite of the difficulty they were having, the child came out pretty shamelessly.

His first opera, Juana de Nápoles (produced when he was 19), was well received at the Gran Teatre del Liceu from Barcelona, and he immediately followed this with Acté, for which (as for all his later operas) he wrote his own libretto. He then spent time in Germany, where he acquired an admiration for Wagner and Richard Strauss, which can be observed in his orchestral writing. Strauss's influence on his harmony can also be particularly heard in his songs. He composed prolifically in many genres, but later destroyed, disowned or radically revised everything he had composed before 1907. This led him, for example, almost completely to rewrite Acté - increasing the complexity of the texture - as Neró i Acté. 

Manén made numerous arrangements, both instrumental and vocal, of Spanish and Catalan folk melodies, and traditional dance styles (e.g. the Sardana) appear in his works. His music is tonal in idiom and predominantly lyrical, and there are often thematic connections between movements. His writings include many articles in Spanish and French periodicals and a treatise on the violin. In 1927 he became a member of the Spanish Academy of Arts; among many other awards and honours, there has been a plan to name a new concert hall in Barcelona after him.

In 1930 he founded and presided over the Barcelona Philharmonic Society (Societat Filarmònica de Barcelona), an influential entity in the Barcelona musical atmosphere that programmed several concerts. His strong and demanding character and his indolent attitude towards the Franco regime made him, at the same time, loved and hated by the society of the moment; The impositions of the dictatorship prompted him to replace Catalan for a lifetime by the Spanish and to timidly approach the Franco regime in order to maintain his artistic activity throughout the country.

He died in 1971 and was buried in the Cementiri de Montjuïc in Barcelona.

The composer

First works 

Joan Manén's first works were very simple pieces for violin and piano, lounge music written to be performed at the concerts he himself performed. In this way, the child prodigy could show off in front of the audience as both performer and composer. One of the works that was most successful among the public was a virtuoso transcription made by Manén himself, a Vals-Jota on the famous zarzuela "El Duo de la Africana" by Manuel Fernández Caballero. Among other works, he wrote a small piece titled "Romancita", probably his first work, and one of the first to be published. Little by little his works were increasing in complexity, as in the case of the four Catalan Caprices, and the "Concierto Español" for violin and orchestra Op. A-7. According to Manén, his learning was constant, and every day he was aware he had made mistakes. It is for this reason, as we will see later, that the re-elaboration of his works was a constant throughout the first two decades of the 20th century.

Development 
As for the style and influences of the first works, we can see that in many cases he took Spanish and Catalan popular themes that were reelaborated through a more central European language than Spanish. His fascination with Ludwig van Beethoven, Richard Wagner and later Richard Strauss made him take pleasure in the great forms and from the beginning of the twentieth century he began to tackle works with a Germanic language of poematic and descriptive style very close to what parallel Richard Strauss was cultivating. In a concert in Cologne on January 4, 1900, Strauss himself accompanied him at the piano for several of his works.

As Manén was gaining a greater command of orchestration his music was able to achieve more expressive depth and in operas such as Acté, premiered in 1903 at the Liceu in Barcelona, achieved through a powerful orchestral technique to condense and develop The drama is very effective and poignant. But to get to write an opera of the size of Acté he had to confront the composition of several zarzuelas such as "The Tantalus Infatuation", or "Elixir de amor" works composed during adolescence in difficult times of his career as a violinist. Thanks to the compositional experience of these works as well as the opera "Giovanna di Napoli", premiered at the Liceu in January 1903, he could face what would possibly be his key piece "Acté".

Consolidation 
The opera "Acté", inherited from a traditionally Germanic tradition, was premiered at the Liceu in December 1903 and was understood by a Barcelona audience accustomed to the highly Italianized taste in those times. Just after the premiere he declared himself in the Catalan Musical Magazine: "I do not think that in the first performance the audience can follow me in everything I want to express in the score, but I trust that in successive auditions I will allow I get to him, especially his feeling, from which I think that the technique should not be but a transmission vehicle and, the more refined and perfect, the more powerful it will reach the feeling of the audience. " But while Manen was quite misunderstood and in many cases little valued on his land, little by little he was opening doors as a composer in Germany; Acté was represented with great success in Dresden (1908), Cologne (1910) and Leipzig (1913) and thanks to the extraordinary public recognition that reached the work, his career as a composer acquires a new impulse. It is then when they see the light symphonic works of magnitude such as Nova Catalònia, Juventus and Suite for violin, piano and orchestra. In these first symphonic works we find a clear example of the style and the characteristics that will define the whole of his orchestral work. These are works that combine a highly skilled orchestration and a highly elaborate thematic elaboration, as a result of an assimilation of the Germanic repertoire, with the intuition and spontaneity of an extroverted musician and in many moments of eminently Mediterranean inspiration.

Works list

Discography 

 2012: "Obres per a violí i piano 1". Kalina Macuta, violin; Daniel Blanch, piano. Joan Manén Collection Vol. 1
 2013: "Sardanes per a cobla". Cobla de cambra de Barcelona, conductor: Jordi Molina.
 2014 "Concert da càmera per a violí i i orquestra nº2 i Concert per a oboè i orquestra". Orquestra Terrassa 48, conductor: Xavier Puig. Violin soloist: Kai Gleusteen. Joan Manén Collection Vol. 2
 2015 "Obra Coral" Lieder Càmera, conductor Xavier Pastrana. Joan Manén Collection Vol. 3
 2016 "Obres per a violí i piano 2". Kalina Macuta, violin; Daniel Blanch, piano. Joan Manén Collection, editat per La mà de Guido, LMG2138.
 2020 Violin Concerto No. 3 Ibérico & Symphony No. 2 Ibérica. Ana María Valderrama, violin. Barcelona Symphony Orchestra, conductor: Darrell Ang. Naxos 8.574274-75

References

 

Composers from Catalonia
1883 births
Spanish violinists
Male violinists
Musicians from Barcelona
1971 deaths
20th-century violinists
20th-century Spanish male musicians